Exposé is the third album by American vocal group Exposé, released in 1992. The album's music style is less Latin influenced than their previous albums, with more adult contemporary material. The album features more of Ann Curless on lead vocals; she sings lead on "I Think I'm in Trouble," "As Long as I Can Dream," "In Walked Love," and "Angel." This album marks the debut of Kelly Moneymaker as a member of the group.

For the track "I Specialize in Love," Jeanette Jurado (who provides the lead vocals for the majority of the album) sings co-lead with Curless, and then shares lead vocals with Curless and Moneymaker during the final bridge.

"I Specialize in Love", "Angel", and "The Same Love" are covers of previously recorded songs; "Angel" was written and recorded by Maria Vidal in 1987, "I Specialize in Love" was a dance hit for Sharon Brown in 1982, while "The Same Love" was a minor hit for the Jets in 1989.

The album was recorded at several studios in the United States—The Hit Factory, Home Boy Recording Studio, Right Track Studios, Sabella Recording Studios, River Sound, Sear Sound, Countdown Recording Studios, Criterion Studios, Conway Recording Studios, Music Grinder—as well as H'Appeny Bridge in the United Kingdom and Soundtrack Recording. The song "I Specialize in Love" was recorded at The Hit Factory, H'Appeny and Soundtrack Recording.

Track listing

Personnel

Exposé
Jeanette Jurado – lead vocals (2, 3, 6, 8, 10, 11, 12), vocals (9), backing vocals
Ann Curless – lead vocals (1, 4, 5, 7), vocals (9), backing vocals
Kelly Moneymaker – vocals (9, 10), backing vocals

Musicians

Bobby Pruit – backing vocals (10)
Victor Bailey – bass (4, 5)
Seymour Barab, Richard Locker, Mark Schuman – cello (4)
Omar Hakim – drums (4, 5)
Lewis A. Martineé – drums (2, 8, 10, 12)
Ben Stivers – drums (2, 8, 10, 12)
John Clark, Peter Gordon – French Horn (4)
Al Pitrelli – guitar (4, 5)
Tim Mitchell – guitar (4, 11), guitar solo (6)
Michael Thompson – guitar (6, 11)
Paul Pesco – guitar (7)
Gary King – guitar (8, 10)
Fred McFarlane – instruments (1), rhythm programming (1, 3, 7), additional keyboards (9)

Lewis A. Martineé – keyboards (2, 8, 10, 12), percussion (2, 8, 10, 12)
Greg Phillinganes – keyboards (4, 5)
Ben Stivers – keyboards (2, 8, 10, 12), percussion (2, 8, 10, 12)
Dave LeBolt – additional keyboards (7)
Robert Magnuson – oboe (4)
Kenny The Man – rap (3)
Tom Timko – saxophone (6)
Alfred Brown, Julien Barber, Olivia Koppell – viola (4)
Lamar Alsop, Elena Barere, Regis Iandiorio, Charles Libove, Carmel Malin, Anthony Posk, Elliot Rosoff, Richard Sortomme, Gerald Tarack – violin (4)

Production

Steve Thompson and Michael Barbiero – producer (1, 3, 4, 5, 7, 9)
Lewis A. Martineé – producer (2, 8, 10, 12)
Guy Roche – producer (6, 11)
DNA – producer (9)
Steve Thompson and Michael Barbiero – arrangements (1, 3, 4, 5, 7)
Lewis A. Martineé – arrangements (2, 8, 10, 12)
Exposé – backing vocals arrangements (3, 6, 11)
Eve Nelson – backing vocals arrangements (4, 5)
Jesse Levy – string arrangement (4)
Michael Barbiero – engineer (1, 3, 4, 5, 7)
Lewis A. Martineé – engineer (2, 8, 10, 12)
Mario Luccy, Arthur Payson, Brett Swain, Frank Wolf – engineer (6, 11)
Gary Tole, Lolly Grodner, Rich Travali – additional engineering (1, 3, 4, 5, 7)

Lee Anthony, David Michael Dill, Nathaniel Foster, Kenny Giola, Andy Grassi, Lolly Grodner, Fred Kevorkian, Gary Tole – assistant engineer (1, 3, 4, 5, 7)
Lawrence Ethan, Mario Luccy, Brett Swain – assistant engineer (6, 11)
Rique Alonso, Femio "1" Hernandez, Jason "Stop-Phonie" Roberts – assistant engineer (2, 8, 10, 12)
Mike Couzzi – vocal engineering (2, 8, 12)
Steve Thompson & Michael Barbiero – mixing (1, 3, 4, 5, 7, 9)
Chris Lord Alge, Lewis A. Martineé – mixing (2, 8, 10, 12)
Brian Malouf – mixing (6, 11)
Pat MacDougall – mixing assistant (6, 11)
Clive Davis – executive producer 
Maude Gilman – art direction
Calvin Lowery – design
Daniel L. Miller – photography
Pantera Group Enterprises, Inc. – direction

Charts

Certifications

References

1992 albums
Exposé (group) albums
Arista Records albums